"I'm Leaning on You" is a song performed by American contemporary Christian music singer Crowder featuring Riley Clemmons. It was released on February 14, 2020, as the fourth single from his third studio album, I Know a Ghost (2018). Crowder co-wrote the song with Brenton Brown, Chris McClarney and Hank Bentley.

"I'm Leaning on You" peaked at No. 19 on the US Hot Christian Songs chart.

Background
Crowder had an interview with Kevin Davis, lead contributor at NewReleaseToday, talking about the song and the inspiration behind it, saying:

Composition

Critical reception
Toby Fournier of Cross Rhythms gave a positive review of the song, saying, "Bare piano chords open the song with David Crowder coming in to deliver his message of hope, which gradually rises to a crescendo and features some killer backing vocals on the chorus and a chord progression that lifts the whole affair sky high."

Commercial performance
"I'm Leaning on You" debuted at number 35 on the US Hot Christian Songs chart dated February 29, 2020. The song peaked at number 19 on the Hot Christian Songs chart dated June 6, 2020, and has spent a total of twenty-five consecutive weeks on the chart.

Music videos
Crowder released the audio video of "I'm Leaning on You" showcasing the I Know a Ghost album artwork through YouTube on November 9, 2018. On February 14, 2020, Crowder released the audio video for the radio version of "I'm Leaning on You" on YouTube. Crowder published the lyric video of "I'm Leaning on You" via YouTube on April 24, 2020.

Track listing

Charts

Weekly charts

Year-end charts

Release history

Other versions
 Passion released "I'm Leaning on You" featuring Crowder and Chidima on their live album, Roar (Live From Passion 2020).

References

External links
 

2020 singles
2018 songs
Crowder (musician) songs
Sparrow Records singles